A game of chance is in contrast with a game of skill. It is a game whose outcome is strongly influenced by some randomizing device.  Common devices used include dice, spinning tops, playing cards, roulette wheels, numbered balls, or in the case of digital games; random number generators. A game of chance may be played as gambling if players wage money or anything of monetary value.

Alternatively, a game of skill  is one in which the outcome is determined mainly by mental or physical skill, rather than chance. 

While a game of chance may have some skill element to it, chance generally plays a greater role in determining its outcome. A game of skill may also may have elements of chance, but skill plays a greater role in determining its outcome.

Gambling is known in nearly all human societies, even though many have passed laws restricting it.  Early people used the knucklebones of sheep as dice.  Some people develop a psychological addiction to gambling, and will risk even food and shelter to continue.

Some games of chance may also involve a certain degree of skill. This is especially true when the player or players have decisions to make based upon previous or incomplete knowledge, such as blackjack. In other games, such as roulette and punto banco, (baccarat) the player may only choose the amount of bet and the thing he wants to bet on; the rest is up to chance, therefore these games are still considered games of chance with small amount of skills required. The distinction between 'chance' and 'skill' is relevant because in some countries chance games are illegal or at least regulated, but skill games are not.  Since there is no standardized definition, poker, for example, has been ruled a game of chance in Germany and, by at least one New York state Federal judge, a game of skill there.

Addiction 

People who engage in games of chance and gambling can develop a strong dependence on them. This is called psychopathology (addiction) of "pathological gambling". According to psychoanalyst Edmund Bergler, there are six characteristics of pathological gamblers:
 They must play regularly: the issue here is to know from when the subject performs "too much."
 The game takes precedence over all other interests.
 There is optimism in the player that is not initiated by repeated experiences of failure.
 The player never stops until they win.
 Despite the precautions that they originally promised, they end up taking too many risks.
 There is in them a subjective experience of "thrill" (a shivering sensation, excitement, tension, both painful and pleasant) during the phases of play.

See also

 Stochastic process
 Game classification
 Monty Hall problem
 Game of skill
 Russian roulette
 Gambler's ruin

References

Game terminology